Sannae-myeon is a myeon, or county, located in South Gyeongsang Province, Miryang, South Korea.

Administrative divisions 
Sannae-myeon is further divided into the following ri (administrative divisions):

Imgo-ri (임고리)
Samyang-ri (삼양리)
Nammyeong-ri (남명리)
Gain-ri (가인리)
Bongui-ri (봉의리)
Songbaek-ri (송백리)
Yongjeon-ri (용전리)
Wonseo-ri (원서리)

See also 
Administrative divisions of South Korea
South Korea portal

References

External links 
Official website 

Miryang
Towns and townships in South Gyeongsang Province